The 2018 United States House of Representatives elections in Nevada were held on November 6, 2018, to elect the four U.S. representatives from the State of Nevada, one from each of the state's four congressional districts. The elections coincided with the Nevada gubernatorial election, as well as other elections to the United States House of Representatives, elections to the United States Senate and various state and local elections. Primary elections were held on June 12, 2018.

Overview
Results of the 2018 United States House of Representatives elections in Nevada by district:

District 1

Nevada's 1st congressional district occupies the southeastern half of Nevada's largest city, Las Vegas, as well as parts of North Las Vegas and parts of unincorporated Clark County. The incumbent is Democrat Dina Titus, who has represented the district since 2013 and previously represented the 3rd district from 2009 to 2011. She was reelected to a third term with 62% of the vote in 2016.

Democratic primary

Primary results

Republican primary

Primary results

General election

Endorsements

Polling

Results

District 2

Nevada's 2nd congressional district includes the northern third of the state. It includes most of Douglas County and Lyon County, all of Churchill County,  Elko County, Eureka County, Humboldt County, Pershing County and Washoe County, as well as the state capital, Carson City. The largest city in the district is Reno, the state's second largest city. Although the district appears rural, its politics are dominated by Reno and Carson City, which combined cast over 85 percent of the district's vote. The incumbent was Republican Mark Amodei, who had represented the district since 2011. He was reelected to a third full term with 58% of the vote in 2016. Amodei ran for reelection and faced a primary challenge from Sharron Angle. Clint Koble, former Nevada State Executive Director of the Farm Service Agency of the USDA, announced he was running for the Democratic nomination in November 2017, winning the nomination and losing to Amodei in the general election.

Democratic primary

Primary results

Republican primary

Primary results

General election

Polling

Results

District 3

The 3rd congressional district occupies the area south of Las Vegas, including Henderson, and most of unincorporated Clark County and was created after the 2000 United States Census. The incumbent was Democrat Jacky Rosen, who has represented the district since 2017. She was elected with 47% of the vote in 2016 to replace Republican U.S. Representative Joe Heck, who ran for the U.S. Senate and lost. She did not run for reelection; instead she ran against and defeated incumbent Dean Heller in the U.S. Senate election.

Democratic primary

Candidates
Declared
 Susie Lee, philanthropist, president of the board of the Communities In Schools of Nevada
 Jack Love, insurance agent
 Steve Schiffman, attorney at law, former USAID Foreign Service Officer and chair of the Partnership for Judicial Progress

Potential
 Nicole Cannizzaro, state senator
 Joyce Woodhouse, state senator

Declined
 Teresa Lowry, former Clark County assistant district attorney and candidate for state senate in 2014
 Jacky Rosen, incumbent U.S. Representative (running for the U.S. Senate)

Primary results

Republican primary

Candidates
Declared
 Scott Hammond, state senator
 David McKeon, former chair of the Clark County Republican Party
 Michelle Mortenson,  former KLAS-TV, Channel 8 consumer reporter 
 Danny Tarkanian, businessman, former attorney and perennial candidate

Declined
 Cresent Hardy, former U.S. Representative (ran in the 4th district)
 Michael Roberson, Minority Leader of the Nevada Senate and candidate for this seat in 2016

Withdrew
 Victoria Seaman, former state assemblywoman and candidate for state senate in 2016 (dropped out after Danny Tarkanian entered race)

Primary results

General election

Debates
Complete video of debate, October 8, 2018

Endorsements

Polling

Results

District 4

The 4th congressional district was created as a result of the 2010 United States Census.  Located in the central portion of the state, it includes most of northern Clark County, parts of Lyon County, and all of Esmeralda County, Lincoln County, Mineral County, Nye County and White Pine County. More than four-fifths of the district's population lives in Clark County.

The incumbent is Democrat Ruben Kihuen, who has represented the district since January 2017. He was elected by defeating incumbent Republican U.S. Representative Cresent Hardy with 49% of the vote in 2016. In December 2017, Kihuen announced that he would not seek reelection in 2018 following allegations of sexual harassment.

Democratic primary
After incumbent Representative Kihuen announced he would not seek reelection in 2018, the only candidate filed to run against him in the primaries was Amy Vilela.

Former U.S. Representative from this district Steven Horsford, who was defeated in the 2014 election, as well as Nevada Legislator Pat Spearman, later announced their plans to run for the Democratic nomination for the seat several months later, due to Kihuen's retirement announcement.

Candidates
Declared
 John Anzalone, high school principal
 Steven Horsford, former U.S. Representative
 Pat Spearman, state senator
 Amy Vilela, universal healthcare activist and Justice Democrats member
 Sid Zeller

Declined
 Lucy Flores, former State Legislator, Democratic nominee for lieutenant governor in 2014 and candidate for NV-04 in 2016
 Ruben Kihuen, incumbent U.S. Representative

Primary results

Republican primary
The Republican primary featured six candidates. The early frontrunner was Cresent Hardy who faced questions about his hiring of Benjamin Sparks, a Las Vegas political adviser who allegedly sexually enslaved and battered his ex-fiancée.

Candidates
Declared
 Dave Gibbs
 Cresent Hardy, former U.S. Representative
 Jeff Miller
 Mike Monroe
 Bill Townsend, entrepreneur
 Kenneth Wegner

Withdrew
 Stavros Anthony, Las Vegas councilman (dropped out due to health reasons)

Declined
 Scott Hammond, state senator

Primary results

Libertarian primary

Candidates

Potential
 Steve Brown, Libertarian nominee for the U.S. House of Representatives in NV-04 in 2014 and 2016 and candidate for the U.S. Senate in Nevada in 2012

General election

Endorsements

Polling

Results

References

External links
Candidates at Vote Smart 
Candidates at Ballotpedia 
Campaign finance at FEC 
Campaign finance at OpenSecrets

Official campaign websites of first district candidates
Dina Titus (D) for Congress
Joyce Bentley (R) for Congress

Official campaign websites of second district candidates
Mark Amodei (R) for Congress
Clint Koble (D) for Congress

Official campaign websites of third district candidates
Susie Lee (D) for Congress
Danny Tarkanian (R) for Congress

Official campaign websites of fourth district candidates
Cresent Hardy (R) for Congress
Steven Horsford (D) for Congress

2018
Nevada
United States House of Representatives